Blood Lightning 2007 is the fifth studio album by Burning Star Core, released on March 17, 2007 by No Fun Productions.

Track listing

Personnel
Adapted from the Blood Lightning 2007 liner notes.
 Robery Beatty – electronics (5)
 Mike Shiflet – electronics (5), computer (5)
 C. Spencer Yeh – violin, recording, mixing, editing
 Trevor Tremaine – drums (5), percussion (5)
Production and additional personnel
 James Plotkin – mastering
 The Wyvern – cover art

Release history

References

External links 
 Blood Lightning 2007 at Discogs (list of releases)
 Blood Lightning 2007 at Bandcamp

2007 albums
Burning Star Core albums
Instrumental albums